William Albert Henry (November 10, 1914 – August 10, 1982) was an American actor who worked in both films and television.

Biography

Born in Los Angeles, California, Henry started as a child actor, then was a hero in B-movies (mainly westerns), and ended his career as a character actor. He appeared in various roles on episodes of many television series. He was a member of the John Ford Stock Company and appeared twelve times for Ford. He also appeared in John Wayne's  The Alamo (1960); in this version of the famous siege, Henry's character, Dr. Sutherland, is the last of the defenders to be killed.

Henry was active with the Pasadena Community Playhouse.

In 1952, Henry was cast as the San Francisco lawyer Lew Barry in the episode, "Self Made Man," of the syndicated television anthology series, Death Valley Days, hosted by Stanley Andrews.

Bill guest starred twice in Gene Barry's TV Western Bat Masterson, once in 1958 as crooked "Sheriff Griff Hanley" (S1E7's "A Noose Fits Anyone") and again in 1960 as stalwart "Sheriff Brady" (S2E23's "The Snare").

Henry's brother was the character actor Thomas Browne Henry.

Henry was married and twice divorced. His first marriage was to Grace Durkin, with whom he had a son, Michael, and a daughter, Michele. He and his second wife, Barbara Knudson, were the parents of William "Bill" Henry, Jr. (b. 1958).

Selected filmography

 Lord Jim (1925) - Street Urchin (uncredited)
 Adorable (1933) - Minor Role (uncredited)
 Best of Enemies (1933) - College Student (uncredited)
 Coming Out Party (1934) - Party Guest (uncredited)
 The Thin Man (1934) - Gilbert Wynant
 Operator 13 (1934) - Young Lieutenant Kissing Blonde (uncredited)
 A Wicked Woman (1934) - Curtis
 China Seas (1935) - Rockwell
 Society Doctor (1935) - Frank Snowden
 The Perfect Tribute (1935) - Wounded soldier (uncredited)
 Exclusive Story (1936) - James Witherspoon Jr.
 Tarzan Escapes (1936) - Eric Parker
 Double or Nothing (1937) - Egbert Clark
 Madame X (1937) - Hugh Fariman Jr.
 Mama Runs Wild (1937) - Paul Fowler
 Four Men and a Prayer (1938) - Rodney Leigh
 Yellow Jack (1938) - Breen
 Campus Confessions (1938) - Wayne Atterbury, Jr.
 A Man to Remember (1938) - Howard Sykes
 Ambush (1939) - Charlie Hartman
 Persons in Hiding (1939) - Agent Dan Waldron
 The Arizona Wildcat (1939) - Donald Clark
 I'm from Missouri (1939) - Joel Streight
 Television Spy (1939) - Douglas Cameron
 Geronimo (1939) - Lt. John Steele, Jr.
 Emergency Squad (1940) - Peter Barton
 Parole Fixer (1940) - Scott Britton
 The Way of All Flesh (1940) - Paul Kriza Jr.
 Queen of the Mob (1940) - Bert Webster
 Cherokee Strip (1940) - Tom Cross
 Jennie (1940) - George Schermer
 Blossoms in the Dust (1941) - Allan Keats
 Dance Hall (1941) - Joe Brooks
 Scattergood Meets Broadway (1941) - David Drew
 Pardon My Stripes (1942) - Henry Platt
 Klondike Fury (1942) - Jim Armstrong
 A Gentleman After Dark (1942) - Paul Rutherford
 Stardust on the Sage (1942) - Jeff Drew
 There's One Born Every Minute (1942) - Lester Cadwalader Jr.
 Rubber Racketeers (1942) - Bill Barry
 Sweater Girl (1942) - Happy Dudley
 Calaboose (1943) - Tom Pendergrast
 I Escaped from the Gestapo (1943) - Gordon - Gestapo Agent
 Sarong Girl (1943) - Jeff Baxter
 False Faces (1943) - Don Westcott
 Alaska Highway (1943) - Steve Ormsby
 Johnny Come Lately (1943) - Pete Dougherty
 Nearly Eighteen (1943) - Jack Leonard
 Women in Bondage (1943) - Heinz Radtke
 Tornado (1943) - Bob Ramsey
 The Navy Way (1944) - Malcolm Randall
 Call of the South Seas (1944) - Agent Paul Russell
 The Lady and the Monster (1944) - Roger Collins
 Going My Way (1944) - Doctor (uncredited)
 The Adventures of Mark Twain (1944) - Charles Langdon
 Silent Partner (1944) - Jeffrey Swales
 G.I. War Brides (1946) - Capt. Roger Kirby
 The Invisible Informer (1946) - Mike Reagan
 The Mysterious Mr. Valentine (1946) - Steve Morgan
 The Fabulous Suzanne (1946) - William Harris
 Trail to San Antone (1947) - Rick Malloy
 Women in the Night (1948) - Maj. von Arnheim
 King of the Gamblers (1948) - Jerry Muller
 The Denver Kid (1948) - Tim Roberts aka Tom Richards
 Death Valley Gunfighter (1949) - Sheriff Keith Ames
 Streets of San Francisco (1949) - Nichols - Reporter
 Motor Patrol (1950) - Officer Larry Collins
 Federal Man (1950) - Agent Phil Sherrin
 David Harding, Counterspy (1950) - Sentry (uncredited)
 The Old Frontier (1950) - Doctor Tom Creighton
 Southside 1-1000 (1950) - Treasury Agent Jones
 Valentino (1951) - Cheating Husband (uncredited)
 Fury of the Congo (1951) - Ronald Cameron
 The Greatest Show on Earth (1952) - Spectator (uncredited)
 Thundering Caravans (1952) - Bert Cranston
 What Price Glory (1952) - Holsen (uncredited)
 Torpedo Alley (1952) - Instructor
 Marshal of Cedar Rock (1953) - Bill Anderson
 Savage Frontier (1953) - Deputy Dan Longley
 Canadian Mounties vs Atomic Invaders (1953, Serial) - Don Roberts
 Hollywood Thrill-Makers (1954) - Dave Wilson
 Secret of the Incas (1954) - Phillip Lang
 Masterson of Kansas (1954) - Charlie Fry
 New Orleans Uncensored (1955) - Joe Reilly
 A Bullet for Joey (1955) - Michael (uncredited)
 Jungle Moon Men (1955) - Bob Prentice
 Mister Roberts (1955) - Lt. Billings
 A Life at Stake (1955) - Myles Norman
 Paris Follies of 1956 (1955) - Wendell
 The Court-Martial of Billy Mitchell (1955) - Officer (uncredited)
 Three Bad Sisters (1956) - Bill Gans - Reporter (uncredited)
 The Wild Dakotas (1956) - Perkins (uncredited)
 Uranium Boom (1956) - Joe McGinnus
 The Harder They Fall (1956) - Fight Arena Locker Room Guard (uncredited)
 The Three Outlaws (1956) - Tall Texan
 Toward the Unknown (1956) - AP Captain (uncredited)
 Accused of Murder (1956) - Officer Walt - at Murder Scene (uncredited)
 The Wings of Eagles (1957) - Naval Aide (uncredited)
 Untamed Youth (1957) - TV Announcer (uncredited)
 Man Afraid (1957) - Reporter (uncredited)
 Spook Chasers (1957) - Harry Shelby
 The Female Animal (1958) - Delivery Man (uncredited)
 Day of the Badman (1958) - Dave Kinds (uncredited)
 Too Much, Too Soon (1958) - Henry Trent - Actor as Alexander Hamilton in Play (uncredited)
 The Lone Ranger and the Lost City of Gold (1958) - Travers
 The Last Hurrah (1958) - Votes Tallyman (uncredited)
 Gunsmoke in Tucson (1958) - Sheriff Will Blane
 The Gunfight at Dodge City (1959) - Regan Henchman (uncredited)
 The Horse Soldiers (1959) - Captain
 Sergeant Rutledge (1960) - Capt. Dwyer (uncredited)
 Seven Ways from Sundown (1960) - Hobbs Saloon Bartender (uncredited)
 The Alamo (1960) - Dr. Sutherland
 Two Rode Together (1961) - Gambler (uncredited)
 The Man Who Shot Liberty Valance (1962) - Gambler (uncredited)
 How the West Was Won (1962) - Staff Officer (uncredited)
 Showdown (1963) - Saloon Bouncer (uncredited)
 He Rides Tall (1964) - Bartender (uncredited)
 The Best Man (1964) - Reporter (uncredited)
 Cheyenne Autumn (1964) - Infantry Captain (uncredited)
 Taggart (1964) - Army Sergeant (uncredited)
 Dear Brigitte (1965) - Racetrack Cashier (uncredited)
 Gunpoint (1966) - Gang Member (uncredited)
 Texas Across the River (1966) - Settler (uncredited)
 El Dorado (1967) - Sheriff Dodd Draper (uncredited)
 Where Were You When the Lights Went Out? (1968) - Stockholder (uncredited)
 The Walls Have Eyes (1969) - Bill Turner
 Skin Game (1971) - (uncredited)

Selected Television

References

External links

 

1914 births
1982 deaths
American male film actors
American male television actors
20th-century American male actors
Male actors from Los Angeles